Uttarakhand Sanskrit University is an Indian State university located in the city of Haridwar, Uttarakhand. Established in 2005, the university offers certificate courses, diplomas, undergraduate education, postgraduate education, doctoral programmes and master of philosophy courses in various disciplines.

History
Uttarakhand Sanskrit University was established on 21 Apr 2005 vide act 17 of 2005. The university is situated on NH-58 in village panchayat Bahadrabad in Haridwar district. Forty-four colleges in Uttarakhand are affiliated to Uttarakhand Sanskrit University.

Faculties
Uttarakhand Sanskrit University retains the following six faculties:
 Faculty of Education
 Faculty of Linguistics and Translation 
 Faculty of Philosophy 
 Faculty of Sahitya 
 Faculty of Vyākaraṇa
 Faculty of Adhunik Gyan Vigyan

See also

University Grants Commission

References

Sanskrit universities in India
Universities in Uttarakhand
Haridwar district
Educational institutions established in 2005
2005 establishments in Uttarakhand